Ctenobium is a genus of death-watch beetles in the family Ptinidae. There is at least one described species in Ctenobium, C. antennatum.

References

Further reading

 
 
 
 
 
 
 

Anobiinae